Arstaddalsdammen is a lake that lies in the municipality of Beiarn in Nordland county, Norway. The  lake lies in the southern end of the Arstaddal valley, and it has a dam on the northern end. The dam was built in the 1960s. The water from the lake is piped to the nearby lake Sokumvatnet in Gildeskål Municipality. The lake serves as a reservoir for the Sundsfjord Hydroelectric Power Station.

See also
 List of lakes in Norway
 Geography of Norway

References

Lakes of Nordland
Beiarn
Reservoirs in Norway